Dale Wayne Wilkinson (born March 18, 1960, in Pocatello, Idaho) is a retired American professional basketball player. He was a 6'10" (208 cm) 220 lb (100 kg) power forward and played collegiately at Idaho State University from 1978 to 1982. He played briefly in the National Basketball Association (NBA) during the 1984-85 season.

Wilkinson was selected with the 16th pick of the tenth round in the 1982 NBA draft by the Phoenix Suns. In his lone season split with the Detroit Pistons and the Los Angeles Clippers, he averaged 1.2 points, 0.3 rebounds and 0.2 assists per game.

Wilkinson played 125 games in the Continental Basketball Association (CBA) from 1982 to 1985 for the Billings Volcanos, Sarasota Stingrays and Wisconsin Flyers. His career averages were 14.8 points and 5.5 rebounds per game. He spent the most time with Wisconsin, for whom he appeared in 71 games.

He wore the jersey numbers 31 and 38.

As the 221st selection in the draft, he is the highest-drafted player in NBA history to appear in a game.

References

1960 births
Living people
American men's basketball players
Basketball players from Idaho
Billings Volcanos players
Detroit Pistons players
Idaho State Bengals men's basketball players
Los Angeles Clippers players
Phoenix Suns draft picks
Power forwards (basketball)
Sarasota Stingers players
Small forwards
Sportspeople from Pocatello, Idaho
Wisconsin Flyers players